Marilù Capparelli is an Italian lawyer and managing director of Google's legal department in EMEA. She has been Google's Director of Legal Affairs since 2009. Capparelli has been a Director of Legal & Public Policy Affairs at eBay, PayPal and Skype Technologies.

Capparelli speaks four languages fluently and she has a PhD from the University of Bologna where she was a visiting lecturer in the Civil Law Department.

References 

Year of birth missing (living people)
Living people
Place of birth missing (living people)
Italian women lawyers
University of Bologna alumni
21st-century Italian lawyers